Big Fun is a fourth studio album by C. C. Catch. It is the last album produced by Dieter Bohlen.

Charts

Track listing 
All songs written by Dieter Bohlen.
Backseat of Your Cadillac — 3:24
Summer Kisses — 3:51
Are You Serious — 3:07
Night in Africa — 4:09
Heartbeat City — 3:38
Baby I Need Your Love — 3:03
Little by Little — 3:06
Nothing but a Heartache — 3:02
If I Feel Love — 3:42
Fire of Love — 3:00

Bonus tracks:
Backseat of Your Cadillac [Instrumental] — 3:14
Summer Kisses [Extended Version] — 6:06
Heartbeat City [Maxi Mix] — 4:54
Baby I Need Your Love [Long Version] — 4:44
Nothing but a Heartache [Extended Version] — 5:05
Backseat of Your Cadillac [Extended Version] — 5:19

Credits
Arranged and produced by Dieter Bohlen
Co-producer – Luis Rodriguez

References

C. C. Catch albums
1988 albums